Isadora Rodrigues Pacheco (born 29 March 2005) is a Brazilian professional skateboarder. She has competed in women's park events at several World Skateboarding Championships, finishing eighth in 2018 and seventh in 2019.

Pacheco qualified to compete at the 2020 Summer Olympics in Tokyo through her position at eleventh in the Olympic World Skateboarding Rankings for women's park. In the inaugural Olympic women's park event, she placed tenth overall.

References

External links
 
 Isadora Pacheco at The Boardr

Living people
2005 births
Brazilian skateboarders
Brazilian sportswomen
Female skateboarders
Olympic skateboarders of Brazil
Skateboarders at the 2020 Summer Olympics
Sportspeople from Florianópolis
21st-century Brazilian women